Zaneta is an unincorporated community in Grundy County, Iowa, United States.

Geography
It is located on County Road D35 west of Hudson, at 42.391686N, -92.551408W.

History
Zaneta was founded in the 1800s. It was named after Zanesville, Ohio; the "Zane" portion was retained while "ta" was added "for euphony". A Methodist church was built at Zaneta in 1902, moved from North Fork.

Zaneta's population was 16 in 1915, and just 12 in 1925.

In 1940, Zaneta's population was 18 residents.

References

Unincorporated communities in Grundy County, Iowa
Unincorporated communities in Iowa